O'Brien's GAC Foreglen is a Gaelic Athletic Association club based in Foreglen, County Londonderry, Northern Ireland. The club is a member of the Derry GAA and currently cater for gaelic football. The club is named after Irish nationalist MP and social revolutionary William O'Brien.  They are the oldest club within the Derry GAA.

Foreglen have won the Derry Intermediate Football Championship three times and the Derry Junior Football Championship once. Underage teams up to U-12's play in North Derry league and championships, from U-14 upwards teams compete in All-Derry competitions. Foreglen won the Derry Intermediate Football Championship in 2012 after they defeated Glen GAC by 3-09 to 1-11. In November 2012, the club were promoted to the Division 1 of the Derry ACFL after a playoff win against Greenlough GAC. In November 2015 they were relegated, losing to Glenullin GAC in the Division 1 relegation play-off. Foreglen again won the Derry Intermediate Championship beating Claudy, 0-15 - 0-09.

Gaelic football
Foreglen fields Gaelic football teams at U9, U11.5, U13, U15, U17, U21, Reserve and Senior levels. They currently compete in the Derry Intermediate Football Championship (See Above) and Division 2 of the Derry ACFL.

They are the oldest team in County Derry since 1888.
1888-2013 125th anniversary

History
O'Brien's first major success came in 1985 when they won the Derry Intermediate Football Championship. They won the competition for a second time in 2004; the final was not played and Foreglen were awarded the title. They then won the competition for a third time in 2012. They then won the competition again in 2019. Foreglen also won the Derry Junior Football Championship in 1990.

Foreglen no longer play 'Down the lane', Over the last few years re-development work has gone on at O'Brien Park. The pitch was officially re-opened in June 2002.
Now foreglen has a clubhouse with gym and indoor hall and a stand.

In the early years they also fielded a hurling team

Camogie
Foreglen also used to field Camogie teams at various age-groups.

Football titles

Senior
 Derry Intermediate Football Championship: 4
 1985, 2004, 2013, 2019
 Derry Junior Football Championship: 1
 1990
 Dr Kerlin Cup: 5
 1958, 1961, 1963, 1965, 2007
 Under 21 All County Football Championship: 1
 2009
Under 21 North Derry Football Championship: 
 2009

Minor
Tommy O'Neill Cup (Derry Minor 'B' Football Championship) 1
2006
North Derry Minor 'B' Football Championship: 1
2006
North Derry Minor 'B' Football League: 2
2001, 2006
Carlin/Duffy Cup: 3
2001, 2007, 2013

Under-16
 North Derry Under-16 Football Championship: 1
 1998
 North Derry Under-16 Football League: 2
 2000, 2005
 Under-16 County Championship: 3
 2009, 2010, 2012

See also
Derry Intermediate Football Championship
List of Gaelic games clubs in Derry

References

External links
O'Brien's Foreglen GAC Official Website

Gaelic games clubs in County Londonderry
Gaelic football clubs in County Londonderry